In April 2018, a series of thunderstorms produced record-breaking rainfall on the Hawaiian Islands of Kauaʻi and Oahu. An upper-level low moved across the area on April 13, generating a mesoscale convective system that moved over eastern Oahu, producing localized heavy rainfall that reached . The heaviest rainfall occurred on northern Kauaʻi. There, a rain gauge owned by the Waipā Foundation, just west of Hanalei, recorded  of rainfall in the 24 hours between 12:45 p.m. on April 14 and 15.

The heavy rainfall produced flash flooding and landslides that covered roads and washed away several vacant houses. The floods damaged or destroyed 532 houses. Public damage totaled $19.7 million (2018 USD), and overall damage was estimated at over $125 million. Damage on Kauai was the worst from a natural disaster since Hurricane Iniki in 1992. Landslides and flooding covered parts of Kuhio Highway in Hawaii.

Meteorological history
On April 11, 2018, an upper-level low was located west of the Hawaiian island of Kauaʻi. The low moved toward Hawaii and drew deep tropical moisture from the south. The low eventually opened into a trough, which crossed over the Hawaiian islands on April 13. That day, a mesoscale convective system (MCS) developed northwest of Molokai and intensified while moving westward through the trade winds. The MCS moved over eastern Oahu, dissipating after moving ashore. Another upper-level low developed on April 14, fueling additional rainfall through April 16, which caused record rainfall on Kauaʻi. The first of a series of thunderstorms moved over northern Kauaʻi around midnight (local time) on April 14. After a five-hour break in rainfall, another set of thunderstorms hit northern Kauaʻi around midnight on April 15 and lasted for about eight hours. The third set of thunderstorms began around 10:00 AM on April 15 and continued until around 7:00 PM.

Impact
The Honolulu National Weather Service issued various flash flood watches and warnings for the flood event. The trough began dropping heavy rainfall over Hawaii on April 13. Flooding damaged or destroyed 532 houses. The flooding knocked down trees and power lines, eroded many bridges and roads, and washed away crops, beehives, and livestock. Overall damage was estimated at over $125 million. Damage to public buildings was estimated at $19.7 million (2018 USD). Despite the damage, there were no deaths or injuries.

Oahu
Over a 15-minute period, a rain gauge in Niu Valley recorded  of precipitation, which has a 4–10% annual return period. The same station recorded  of rainfall over a two-hour period, which has a 0.5–1% annual return period. The rainfall on Oahu was largely limited to the eastern one-third of the island.

During the rain event, Wailupe Gulch reported an  rise in floodwaters. Flooding entered cars and hundreds of houses on Oahu. The floods also caused significant runoff, leaving a layer of debris on roads. A mudslide covered a portion of the same highway near Kailua. Downed trees closed one block of Maunaloa Avenue in Kaimuki.

Kauaʻi
On Kauaʻi, the rainfall event occurred at low elevations near the northern coast. This was unusual, as previous rain events on the island usually occurred over higher elevations. The heaviest rainfall occurred early on April 15. A rain gauge owned by the Waipā Foundation, just west of Hanalei on Kauaʻi's northern coast, recorded  of rainfall in the 24 hours ending at 12:45 p.m. local time. The total greatly surpassed the Hawaiʻi 24-hour rainfall record of  set on January 25, 1956, at Kīlauea . Furthermore, this total broke the national 24-hour rainfall record of  set during Tropical Storm Claudette on July 25–26, 1979 in Alvin, Texas, a record confirmed in December 2018. Elsewhere on northern Kauaʻi, a rain gauge in Wainiha recorded , and a gauge in Hanalei recorded  before it failed. Minimal rainfall occurred on the southern and western coasts of Kauaʻi. The intense rainfall washed out several river gauges. Along the Hanalei River, the United States Geological Survey (USGS) estimated that floodwaters rose , representing a peak flow rate of 32,700 cubic feet per second (ft3/s, 926 m3/s), before the station failed. The Wainiha River reported a record flow rate during the storm event.

The rain event caused the worst natural disaster in Kauai since Hurricane Iniki in 1992. The sudden rains caused landslides, mostly in isolated areas, as well as flash flooding, causing power outages in Hanalei and Wainiha. Rising waters washed out four vacant homes and entered dozens of other homes. The rising waters forced guests at the Hanalei Colony Resort to move to the second floor. Landslides occurred at 15 locations along the same highway, leaving residents in Wainiha and Haena without regional road access, disrupting relief efforts. Three bridges along the route were damaged, which delayed repairs from being made, leaving the Kuhio Highway closed as of November 2018. Residents used a  detour on a dirt road. The flooding forced the temporary closure of three beaches – Kalapaki Beach, Koloa Landing, and Moloaa Bay – as well as two parks, Nā Pali Coast State Park and Haʻena State Park. Residents in Wainiha and Haena were urged to limit their water use due to contaminated water supply.

Aftermath and records
Kauai Mayor Bernard Carvalho Jr. declared a state of emergency for portions of Kauai, which effectively restricted tourist operations in the Hanalei region. The mayor extended the emergency four more times, effective through January 4, 2019. After the floods, Hawaiian Governor David Ige also declared a State of Emergency. On April 18, the Hawaiian legislature approved $125 million in disaster funding, including $100 million for Kauaʻi. On May 8, United States President Donald Trump declared a federal disaster area for Kauaʻi and Honolulu counties. Initially, the declaration was limited to federal reimbursement for repairs to public infrastructure, but was expanded to include individual assistance on June 27. Ultimately, the Federal Emergency Management Agency (FEMA) approved 250 individual assistance applications, which totaled about $1.5 million, with another $2.6 million in public assistance grants. FEMA opened three disaster recovery centers, which provided resources for the application process; these centers were closed by July 20. On November 30, Kauai Mayor Carvalho granted $500,000 to six nonprofits for counselors, meals, emergency supplies, and rebuilding parts of the Limahuli Garden and Preserve.

Local and national emergency crews rescued people from their flooded homes by helicopter, boat, and bus, including 475 by helicopter; more than 40% of those rescued by helicopter were tourists. The Hawaii Department of Transportation ran convoys throughout the day along the damaged portions of Kuhio Highway while the roadway was being repaired. The cost of reconstructing the Kuhio Highway was estimated at around $100 million; much of it would be covered by the federal government. In August 2018, Hurricane Lane dropped heavy rainfall in the same area, causing further flooding damage to houses and the Kuhio Highway. The Hanalei post office, damaged during the flooding event, was reopened on July 30. A Red Cross shelter in Kilauea housed 13 people after the event. Some of the displaced stayed with family or friends. The Hanalei Colony Resort evacuated its guests on April 16 and remained closed through October. The resort temporarily housed National Guardsmen and families displaced by the floods. At least two dozen students used the resort as a temporary school. The staff of the resort won the Excellence in Community Service Award at the 29th Annual Na Po‘e Pa‘ahana Awards, a ceremony for excellence in the hospitality industry.

On August 2, 2018, National Weather Service Senior Hydrologist Kevin Kodama inspected and calibrated record-breaking rain gauge at Waipā Garden, confirming that the instrument was functioning normally. On December 4, 2018, the National Climate Extremes Committee verified that the  accumulation was the highest 24-hour rainfall total in the United States.

See also

List of wettest tropical cyclones in the United States
Hurricane Lane (2018) – a hurricane that brought heavy rainfall to Hawaii in August 2018
March 2021 Hawaii floods – Another major flood event in Hawaii

Notes

References

2018 meteorology
Natural disasters in Hawaii
Floods in Hawaii
April 2018 events in the United States